Agaricus inapertus is a species of secotioid fungus in the genus Agaricus. It was first described by American mycologists Rolf Singer and Alexander H. Smith in 1958 as Endoptychum depressum. Molecular analysis later proved it to be aligned with Agaricus, and it was formally transferred in a 2003 publication.

See also
 List of Agaricus species

References

External links
 

inapertus
Fungi described in 1958
Fungi of North America
Secotioid fungi